Teachers Life Insurance Society (Fraternal), operating as Teachers Life, is a Canadian fraternal benefit society which provides life insurance and disability insurance to members in Alberta, British Columbia and Ontario.

History 

Teachers Life was founded to by a group of Ontario secondary school teachers with the goal of helping each other. Teachers Life was incorporated in 1939 and federally incorporated in 2008.

Teachers Life Today 

Teachers Life is a Fraternal Benefit Society providing life insurance products to its members. As a Fraternal Benefit Society membership is limited to members of the education community and their immediate families.

Teachers Life is regulated by the Office of the Superintendent of Financial Institutions and Financial Services Commission of Ontario.

References 

Philanthropic organizations based in Canada
Mutual organizations
Organizations established in 1939
Life insurance companies of Canada